Great Communicator (1983–1990) is an American Thoroughbred racehorse best known for winning the 1988 Breeders' Cup Turf.

Owned by George Ackel and trained by his son Thad, Great Communicator was a grandson of the Hall of Fame sire Bold Ruler, an eight-time Leading sire in North America whose progeny includes the legendary Secretariat.

Great Communicator suffered a breakdown in 1990 at the Carleton F. Burke Handicap in Santa Anita Park and was euthanized.

Pedigree

References

 Great Communicator's pedigree and partial racing stats

External links
 Great Communicator's pedigree and partial racing stats

1983 racehorse births
1990 racehorse deaths
Horses who died from racing injuries
Thoroughbred family 1-a
Racehorses bred in Kentucky
Racehorses trained in the United States
Breeders' Cup Turf winners